The 2015 Amber Valley Borough Council election took place on 7 May 2015 to elect members of Amber Valley Borough Council in England. This was on the same day as other local elections. The Conservatives gained two seats and thereby retook control of the council.

After the election the composition of the council was:
Conservative 24
Labour 21

Election result

Ward results

Percentage change in party votes are from the last time the ward was contested. This may have been 2011, 2013 or 2014.

References

2015 English local elections
May 2015 events in the United Kingdom
2015
2010s in Derbyshire